Mega Adventure Park - Singapore is located on the picturesque Sentosa Island, host to Singapore’s main attractions. The park operates world famous MegaZip flying fox, spanning 450m, flying at 60 km/hour, over the island's jungles and beaches. There are 3 additional activities, a 36-obstacle treetop ropes course (MegaClimb), a 15m free fall simulator (MegaJump) and a dynamic bungee assisted trampolines (MegaBounce).

Attractions

MegaZip
Participants are connected to the zip-line by a customized "zipper" that rolls them down the line from the start to the end.

MegaClimb
Participants are provided with full-body harnesses and are connected to continuous belaying systems. The course has 12 obstacles per level, and includes confidence gaps, horizontal ladders and mini flying foxes.

MegaJump
MegaJump is a simulated parachute jump. Participants experience the sensation of a free fall from jumping off a  tower while connected to a power fan descender that ensures a soft and safe landing.

MegaBounce
MegaBounce is based on a simple trampoline with the added feature of a system of elastic bands that allows participants to make higher-than-normal jumps safely – they can "bounce" up to  into the air.

References

External links

Amusement parks in Singapore
Tourist attractions in Singapore
Adventure parks